West Valley is an unincorporated community in Armstrong County, Pennsylvania, United States.

Notes

Unincorporated communities in Armstrong County, Pennsylvania
Unincorporated communities in Pennsylvania